is a Japanese former Nippon Professional Baseball outfielder.

References 

1968 births
Living people
Baseball people from Kumamoto Prefecture
Japanese baseball players
Nippon Professional Baseball outfielders
Yomiuri Giants players
Japanese baseball coaches
Nippon Professional Baseball coaches